Dança dos Famosos 9, also taglined as Dança dos Famosos 2012 is the ninth season of the Brazilian reality television show Dança dos Famosos which premiered May 13, 2012, with the competitive live shows beginning on the following week on May 20, 2012 on the Globo television network.

On September 16, 2012, actor Rodrigo Simas & Raquel Guarini won the competition over actress Cláudia Ohana & Patrick Carvalho.

Couples

Scoring chart

Summaries

Week 1
 Presentation of the Celebrities
Aired: May 13, 2012

Week 2
Style: Disco
Aired: May 20, 2012

Judges in order from left to right: Artistic Jury – 1 – Deborah Secco (actress), 2 – Marcello Novaes (actor), 3 – Artur Xexeo (journalist); Technical Jury – 4 – Maria Pia Finocchio (artistic director), 5 – Renato Vieira (artistic airector); Last Jury – 6 – Audience.

Running Order

Week 3
 Style: Disco
Aired: May 27, 2012

Judges in order from left to right: Artistic Jury – 1 – Massimo Ferrari (chef),  2 – Nathalia Dill (actress), 3 – Raphael Viana (actor); Technical Jury – 4 – Fernanda Chamma (artistic director), 5 – Carlinhos de Jesus (choreographer); Last Jury – 6 – Audience.

Running Order

Week 4
 Style: Forró
Aired: June 3, 2012

Judges in order from left to right: Artistic Jury – 1 – Sergio Loroza (actor), 2 – Cléo Pires (actress), 3 – Luiz Maluf (Caras magazine editor); Technical Jury – 4 – Suely Machado (choreographer), 5 – J.C. Violla (dance teacher); Last Jury – 6 – Audience.

Running Order

Week 5
 Style: Forró
Aired: June 10, 2012

Judges in order from left to right: Artistic Jury – 1 – Ana Beatriz Barros (model), 2 – Jonatas Faro (actor), 3 – Debora Nascimento (actress); Technical Jury – 4 – Paulo Goulart Filho (choreographer), 5 – Ana Botafogo (ballet dancer); Last Jury – 6 – Audience.

Running Order

Week 6
 Style: Bolero
Aired: June 17, 2012

Judges in order from left to right: Artistic Jury – 1 – Carlos Miele (stylist), 2 – Mayana Neiva (actress), 3 – Humberto Martins (actor); Technical Jury – 4 – Carlota Portella (choreographer), 5 – Ivaldo Bertazzo (choreographer); Last Jury – 6 – Audience.

Running Order

Week 7
 Style: Bolero
Aired: June 24, 2012

Judges in order from left to right: Artistic Jury – 1 – Bruno Astuto (Época magazine columnist, 2 – Renata Kuerten (model), 3 – Aílton Graça (actor); Technical Jury – 4 – Hulda Bittencourt (ballet dancer), 5 – Ciro Barcelos (choreographer); Last Jury – 6 – Audience.

Running Order

Week 8
 Style: Foxtrot
Aired: July 1, 2012

Judges in order from left to right: Artistic Jury – 1 – Ciro Batelli (circus main director), 2 – Fernanda Souza (actress), 3 – Carmo Dalla Vecchia (actor); Technical Jury – 4 – Fernanda Chamma (artistic director), 5 – Jarbas Homem de Mello (choreographer); Last Jury – 6 – Audience.

Running Order

Week 9
Style: Rock and Roll
Aired: July 22, 2012

Judges in order from left to right: Artistic Jury – 1 – Felix Fassone (Contigo! magazine columnist), 2 – Juliana Paes (actress), 3 – Nelson Freitas (comedian); Technical Jury – 4 – Lourdes Braga (dance teacher), 5 – J.C. Violla (choreographer).

Running Order

Week 10
Style: Rock and Roll
Aired: July 29, 2012

Judges in order from left to right: Artistic Jury – 1 – Jayme Matarazzo (actor), 2 – Christiane Torloni (actress), 3 – Caçulinha (pianist); Technical Jury – 4 – Regina Calil (choreographer), 5 – Renato Vieira (artistic director).

Running Order

Week 11
Style: Funk
Aired: August 5, 2012

Judges in order from left to right: Artistic Jury – 1 – Ancelmo Gois (journalist), 2 – Paolla Oliveira (actress), 3 – Diogo Nogueira (singer); Technical Jury – 4 – Carlota Portella (choreographer), 5 – Fly (choreographer).

Running Order

Week 12
Style: Salsa
Aired: August 12, 2012

Judges in order from left to right: Artistic Jury – 1 – Mariana Rios (actress), 2 – Gustavo Rosa (painter), 3 – Regina Duarte (actress); Technical Jury – 4 – Ivaldo Bertazzo (choreographer), 5 – Suely Machado (choreographer).

Running Order

Week 13
Style: Waltz
Aired: August 19, 2012

Judges in order from left to right: Artistic Jury – 1 – Ana Maria Braga (television host), 2 – Wanderley Nunes (hair stylist), 3 – Danielle Winits (actress); Technical Jury – 4 – Anselmo Zolla (theatre director), 5 –  Ana Botafogo (ballet dancer).

Running Order

Week 14
Style: Country
Aired: August 26, 2012

Judges in order from left to right: Artistic Jury – 1 – Regina Martelli  (journalist), 2 – Mateus Solano (actor), 3 – Ana Cláudia Michels (model); Technical Jury – 4 – Ciro Barcellos (dance teacher), 5 – Fátima Bernardes (journalist).

Running Order

Week 15
Round 1
Style: Pasodoble
Aired: September 2, 2012

Judges in order from left to right: Artistic Jury – 1 – Fábio Assunção (actor), 2 – Preta Gil (singer), 3 – Rodrigo Hilbert (actor), 4 – Michella Cruz (model), 5 – Luciano Huck (television host); Technical Jury –  6 – Carlota Portela (choreographer), 7 – Carlinhos de Jesus (choreographer), 8 – Suely Machado (choreographer), 9 – Ivaldo Bertazzo (choreographer), 10 – Lourdes Braga (dance teacher).

Running Order

Week 16 
Round 2
Style: Tango & Samba
Aired: September 16, 2012

Judges in order from left to right: Artistic Jury – 1 – Romero Britto (painter), 2 – Sheron Menezzes (actress), 3 – Arthur Xexéo (journalist), 4 – Ivete Sangalo (singer), 5 – Miguel Roncato (actor); Technical Jury – 6 – Maria Pia Finocchio (artistic director), 7 – J.C. Violla (choreographer), 8 – Fernanda Chamma (artistic director), 9 – Renato Vieira (artistic director), 10 – Ana Botafogo (ballet dancer).

Running Order

Final Results

References

External links
 

2012 Brazilian television seasons
Season 09